Father Michael Morrison (October 1908, Listowel, County Kerry, Ireland, U.K. -  April 1973, Dublin, Republic of Ireland) was an Irish Jesuit priest. Educated at Sexton St. Christian Brothers, and at the Jesuit Mungret College, Limerick, he trained as a Jesuit Priest in St Stanislaus College, Tullabeg, Co. Offaly from 1925, and was ordained on 31 July 1939.

He was teaching at Belvedere College when in 1941 during the Second World War, the British army called on Irish priests to serve as chaplains.

He was a British Army chaplain associated with the allied liberation of Belsen, a notorious death camp in April 1945. He made that atrocious camp into a center for daily Holy Mass. Several people of varying religious persuasions attended his services.

Following the war he went to Australia working as a teacher.

He collapsed while walking up the steps in Belvedere House and Gardens and died in Jervis Street Hospital soon after in April 1973. He is buried in Glasnevin Cemetery, Dublin.

References

20th-century Irish Jesuits
1908 births
1973 deaths
Irish military chaplains
World War II chaplains
Faculty of Belvedere College